First Daughter may refer to:

The daughter of a republic's head of state; see First Family
 First Family of the United States
First Daughter (Brack), a 1955 painting by John Brack
First Daughter (1999 film), a television film starring Monica Keena and Mariel Hemingway
First Daughter (2004 film), a feature film starring Katie Holmes
The First Daughter (novel), a novel by Ugandan author Goretti Kyomuhendo